Over the years, Blackmore's Night have released 11 studio albums, 11 commercial singles, 3 live albums and 1 compilation albums.

Albums

Studio albums

Live albums

Compilation albums

Singles

Live DVDs

Music videos

 Shadow of the Moon (1997)
 No Second Chance (1997)
 Renaissance Faire (1997)
 The Times They Are a Changin''' (2001)
 Hanging Tree (2001)
 Way to Mandalay (2003)
 Christmas Eve (English Version) (2005)
 Christmas Eve (German Version) (2005)
 Once in a Million Years (2005)
 Village Lanterne (2006)
 Olde Mill Inn (2006)
 Locked Within the Crystal Ball (2008)
 Highland (2010)
 Dancer and the Moon (2013)
 The Moon is Shining (Somewhere Over the Sea) (2013)
 Christmas Eve (2013 Version) (2014)
 All Our Yesterdays (2015)
 Will O' The Wisp (2015)
 Second Element (2021)

Live VHSShadow of the Moon – Live in Germany 1997–1998 (1999)Under a Violet Moon – Castle Tour 2000'' (2002)

References

Folk music discographies
Discographies of British artists